Mei-Ling Ting Lee is a Taiwanese-American biostatistician known for her research on microarrays.
She is a professor of epidemiology and biostatistics at the University of Maryland, College Park, and the founding editor-in-chief of the journal Lifetime Data Analysis. She was president of the International Chinese Statistical Association for 2016.

Education and career
Lee was born in Taipei, and earned bachelor's and master's degrees in mathematics from National Taiwan University in 1975 and National Tsing Hua University in 1977 respectively.
She earned her PhD in statistics from the University of Pittsburgh in 1980, and has become a naturalized US citizen.

She has worked on the faculty of Bridgewater State College (1983–1984),
Boston University (1984–1992),
the Harvard Medical School (1993–1999),
the Harvard School of Public Health (2000–2005),
Ohio State University (2005–2008), and the University of Maryland (since 2008).
At Ohio State, she chaired the Biostatistics Division of the School of Public Health and became a Distinguished Professor in Biostatistics and Computational Biology.

Selected publications

Books

Research papers

Awards and honors
Lee is an elected member of the International Statistical Institute since 1995 and a fellow of the Royal Statistical Society (1998), American Statistical Association (1999), and Institute of Mathematical Statistics (2005).

References

External links

Year of birth missing (living people)
Living people
Scientists from Taipei
American women epidemiologists
Taiwanese epidemiologists
American statisticians
Taiwanese statisticians
Women statisticians
Biostatisticians
National Taiwan University alumni
National Tsing Hua University alumni
University of Pittsburgh alumni
Bridgewater State University faculty
Boston University faculty
Harvard Medical School faculty
Harvard School of Public Health faculty
Ohio State University faculty
University of Maryland, College Park faculty
Elected Members of the International Statistical Institute
Fellows of the Royal Statistical Society
Fellows of the American Statistical Association
Fellows of the Institute of Mathematical Statistics
Academic journal editors